All American Girls is the fifth studio album by the American R&B vocal group Sister Sledge, released on February 2, 1981, by Cotillion Records. Unlike their previous albums, the group served as co–producers, with Kathy Sledge and Joni Sledge writing the songs.

Background
Released in February 1981, this album was a departure from the past band style and does not feature production by Nile Rodgers or Bernard Edwards. Instead, Narada Michael Walden was the main producer of the project. Four singles were released from this album.

The first single and biggest hit from the album was "All American Girls", written by songwriter Allee Willis along with Joni Sledge and Narada Michael Walden's then–wife Lisa Walden. Released in January 1981, The song peaked at number three on the R&B/Soul charts and 79 on the Hot 100 charts in late–March 1981. It was also a Top 10 hit in the Low Countries, reaching number eight in The Netherlands and number six in Belgium.  It also charted in Germany (#27) and the UK (#41).

The follow–up single was "Next Time You'll Know" which was released in April 1981. The single peaked at number 82 on the Hot 100 charts by mid–May 1981. In August 1981, the third single "If You Really Want Me" written by the youngest member Kathy Sledge was released and "He's Just a Runaway" in late 1981.

Track listing
"All American Girls" (Allee Willis, Joni Sledge, Lisa Walden) – 4:42
"He's Just a Runaway" (Allee Willis) – 3:57
"If You Really Want Me" (Kathy Sledge) – 4:37
"Next Time You'll Know" (Allee Willis) – 3:57
"Happy Feeling" (Kathy Sledge) – 3:35
"Ooh, You Caught My Heart" (Allee Willis, Narada Michael Walden) – 4:25
"Make a Move" (Bob Allen, Joni Sledge) – 3:47
"Don't Let Me Lose It" (Allee Willis) – 2:53
"Music Makes Me Feel Good" (Kathy Sledge) – 4:29
"I Don't Want to Say Goodbye" (Jeff Cohen, Narada Michael Walden) – 3:39

Personnel

Sister Sledge
Kathy Sledge – lead vocals (1, 2, 3, 4, 6, 8, 9)
Joni Sledge – lead vocals (7)
Kim Sledge – lead vocals (10)
Debbie Sledge – lead vocals (5)
with:
Bob Castell-Blanch – guitar
Frank Martin – keyboards
Randy Jackson – bass guitar
Narada Michael Walden – drums
 The See America Horns:
Marc Russo – saxophone
Dave Grover – trumpet, trombone
Bill Lamb – trumpet, trombone
Wayne Wallace – trombone

Production

Narada Michael Walden – producer
Sister Sledge – co–producer
Bob Clearmountain – sound engineer
Humberto Gatica – engineer
Ken "Kessanova" Kessie – engineer
David Greenberg – assistant engineer
Laertes "Doc" Muldrow – assistant engineer
Maureen Droney – assistant engineer
Bob Ludwig – mastering
All songs recorded and mixed at The Automatt, Davlen Studios & Power Station

References

External links 
 Sister Sledge - All American Girls (1981) album releases & credits at Discogs
 Sister Sledge - All American Girls (1981) album to be listened as stream on Spotify

1981 albums
Cotillion Records albums
Sister Sledge albums
Albums produced by Narada Michael Walden